Le Voyage: The Jean-Luc Ponty Anthology is a compilation album by French jazz fusion artist Jean-Luc Ponty, released in 1996.

Track listing 
All songs by Jean-Luc Ponty.
 "Question with No Answer" – 3:29
 "Bowing-Bowing" – 4:53
 "Echoes of the Future" – 3:11
 "Aurora, Pt. 2" – 6:15
 "Waking Dream" – 2:26
 "Renaissance" – 5:48
 "New Country" – 3:09
 "Enigmatic Ocean, Pt. 2" – 3:37
 "Enigmatic Ocean, Pt. 3" – 3:43
 "Mirage" – 4:54
 "Egocentric Molecules" – 5:49
 "Cosmic Messenger" – 4:41
 "Ethereal Mood" – 4:04
 "I Only Feel Good with You" – 3:17
 "No Strings Attached" (live) – 6:02
 "Stay with Me" – 5:36
 "A Taste for Passion" – 5:25
 "Once a Blue Planet" – 4:05
 "Forms of Life" – 4:49
 "Rhythms of Hope" – 4:03
 "Mystical Adventures, Pt. 4" – 0:47
 "Mystical Adventures, Pt. 5" – 5:06
 "Jig" – 3:58
 "Final Truth, Pt. 1" – 4:55
 "Computer Incantations for World Peace" – 5:41
 "Individual Choice" – 4:57
 "Nostalgia" – 5:03
 "Eulogy to Oscar Romero" – 2:34
 "Infinite Pursuit" – 5:59
 "In the Kingdom of Peace" – 4:04
 "Caracas" – 3:51
 "Forever Together" – 5:46

References

1996 compilation albums
Jean-Luc Ponty albums
Rhino Records compilation albums